Kassim Traoré (born 15 February 1966) is a Malian boxer. He competed in the men's lightweight event at the 1988 Summer Olympics.

References

External links
 

1966 births
Living people
Malian male boxers
Olympic boxers of Mali
Boxers at the 1988 Summer Olympics
Place of birth missing (living people)
Lightweight boxers
21st-century Malian people